The New Holland frog (Ranoidea novaehollandiae), also known as wide-mouthed frog, is a large species of burrowing frog native to northern New South Wales and the eastern portion of Queensland, Australia.

Description 
The New Holland frog is a large species, reaching a maximum size of 100 mm.  It is normally pale grey, brown, or yellowish, occasionally with darker blotches.  The belly is white and the throat is speckled. A dark stripe runs from the snout, through  the Tympanum, and down to the shoulder.  Normally, a dark band runs from under the eye down to the mouth.  The thighs are bluish in colour. The toes are slightly webbed.

Ecology and behaviour 
This species is associated with black-soil plains and flood plains near rivers. They inhabit dams, ditches, and claypans in woodland and grassland.  Being a burrowing species, they spend extended periods underground to survive dry conditions. After heavy rains fall during spring, summer, and early autumn, frogs become very active and males make a deep "waah" call from in or beside water.

Up to 1000 eggs per clump are laid in a nonfoamy masses in shallow water. These clumps are initially floating, but later sink. An average of 4906 eggs are laid. Tadpoles are large, reaching 95–100 mm and are rotund and golden brown. Tadpoles' lifespan is 4 to 6 weeks and metamorphs measure 35–40 mm. They resemble the adults, although they may be bright green in colour.

References

Further reading
 Robinson, M. 2002. A Field Guide to Frogs of Australia. Australian Museum/Reed New Holland: Sydney.
 Anstis, M. 2002. Tadpoles of South-eastern Australia. Reed New Holland: Sydney. 
 Frogs Australia Network - New Holland frog - frog call available here

Cyclorana
Amphibians of Queensland
Amphibians of New South Wales
Amphibians described in 1867
Frogs of Australia